When Lights Are Low is an album by guitarist Kenny Burrell recorded in 1978 and released on the Concord Jazz label.

Reception

Allmusic awarded the album 2½ stars with Scott Yanow stating "This session is so relaxed and tasteful as to be rather dull. Guitarist Kenny Burrell seems so intent on every note being appropriate that the results are overly safe and predictable".

Track listing 
All compositions by Kenny Burrell except where noted
 "When Lights Are Low" (Benny Carter, Spencer Williams) – 4:51
 "Body and Soul" (Johnny Green, Edward Heyman, Frank Eyton, Robert Sour) – 6:25
 "Li'l Darlin'" (Neal Hefti) – 5:28
 "Blue Muse" – 5:15
 "Ain't Misbehavin'" (Fats Waller, Harry Brooks, Andy Razaf) – 4:58
 "It Shouldn't Happen to a Dream" (Duke Ellington, Don George, Johnny Hodges) – 6:25
 "Blues for Basie" – 6:28

Personnel 
Kenny Burrell – guitar 
Larry Gales – bass
Carl Burnett – drums

References 

Kenny Burrell albums
1979 albums
Concord Records albums